Kahriz-e Hoseynabad-e Nazem (also Romanized as Kahrīz-e Ḩoseynābād-e Nāz̧em; also known as Kahrīz and Kahrīz Ḩoseynābād) is a village in Haram Rud-e Sofla Rural District, Samen District, Malayer County, Hamadan Province, Iran. At the 2006 census, its population was 494, in 123 families.

References 

Populated places in Malayer County